Chris Freeman may refer to:

Musicians
 Chris Freeman (Australian musician) (c. 1950 – 1992), Australian classical and flamenco multi-instrumentalist
 Chris Freeman (musician) (born 1961), American bassist, founding member of Pansy Division
 Chris Freeman, British keyboardist/percussionist, former member of the band Manchester Orchestra
 Chris Hawkins Freeman, singer with The Hinsons (1974–1981) and The Freemans

Other people
 Christopher Freeman (1921–2010), English economist
 Chris Freeman (scientist), British environmental scientist